Ascochyta agropyrina is a species of fungi belonging to the family Didymellaceae.

References

Pleosporales